The great majority of wind turbines around the world belong to individuals or corporations who use them to generate electric power or to perform mechanical work. As such, wind turbines are primarily designed to be working devices. However, the large size and height above surroundings of modern industrial wind turbines, combined with their moving rotors, often makes them among the most conspicuous objects in their areas. A few localities have exploited the attention-getting nature of wind turbines by placing them on public display, either with visitor centers on their bases, or with viewing areas farther away. The wind turbines themselves are generally of conventional horizontal-axis, three-bladed design, and generate power to feed electrical grids, but they also serve the unconventional roles of technology demonstration, public relations, and education.

Notable wind turbines on public display
 Australia
 Blayney Wind Farm, New South Wales has a viewing area and interpretive centre
 Wattle Point Wind Farm, South Australia has an information centre
 Albany Wind Farm has board walks, viewing towers, interpretive displays and picnic areas on and around the site. It is also traversed by the Bibbulmun Track.

 Canada
 The OPG 7 commemorative turbine is a Vestas V80-1.8MW wind turbine on the site of the Pickering Nuclear Generating Station
 The ExPlace Wind Turbine is a Lagerwey Wind model LW 52 wind turbine at Exhibition Place in Toronto

 China
 Inner Mongolia's Huitengxile Wind Farm has 14 visitor centers to accommodate wind power tourists to the remote region

 Hong Kong
 Lamma Winds in Hong Kong has a single Nordex N50/800 kW model with a rotor diameter of 50m and a nameplate capacity of 800 kW

 New Zealand
 Brooklyn, Wellington, New Zealand has a 230 kW wind turbine

 United Kingdom
 Green Britain Centre, Swaffham, Norfolk - the only wind turbine in the UK that is open for the public to climb. Also doubles as a visitor's centre, cafe and education provider. "Permanently closed" for the third time.
 Green Park Business Park has an Enercon E-70 2 MW wind turbine adjacent to the M4 motorway, billed as the UK's most visible turbine
 Renewable Energy Systems has a Vestas V29 225 kW wind turbine visible from the M25 motorway at its headquarters at Beaufort Court, Kings Langley, Hertfordshire
 Scroby Sands wind farm has a visitor center at Great Yarmouth open during the tourist season (May–October)
 Scout Moor Wind Farm "has become a real tourist attraction" since its 2008 opening
 Whitelee Wind Farm near Glasgow has become the first wind energy project in Scotland to join the Association of Scottish Visitor Attractions (ASVA).

 United States

 Brooklyn, New York Sims Metal Management, a large recycling company which holds a 40-year contract with the City of New York has a 160-foot 100 kW small wind turbine which sits on the north corner of the property. When it was activated in January 2015, it was the city's tallest. It produces about 4% of the facility's power.. The Sunset Park Material Recovery Facility administrative building includes an education center which includes exhibits explaining how the plant operates for student and tour groups and connects to the main processing building for public viewing via elevated pedestrian walkway. 
 Dorchester, Massachusetts – Local 103 of the International Brotherhood of Electrical Workers installed the first commercial-scale wind turbine within the City of Boston, a 100 kW unit from Fuhrlaender on a 35-meter tower with rotor diameter of 21 meters, visible from the John F. Kennedy Library
 Ellensburg, Washington – Puget Sound Energy's Renewable Energy Center at the Wild Horse Wind and Solar Facility has a 5,000 sq. ft. visitor center, which features numerous exhibits, a conference room, and guided tours to the base of a wind turbine. The center sits on a ridge at 3,500 ft. in the middle of the 149 turbine facility (Vestas V80 turbines). The Wild Horse Wind Farm is open to visitors from 9:00-5:30 daily, from April through November. 
 Dorchester, Massachusetts - Local 103 of the International Brotherhood of Electrical Workers installed the first commercial-scale wind turbine within the City of Boston, a 100 kW unit from Fuhrlaender on a 35-meter tower with rotor diameter of 21 meters, visible from the John F. Kennedy Library
 The Great Lakes Science Center in Cleveland, Ohio has a reconditioned Vestas V27 wind turbine with a nameplate capacity of 225 kW
 Great River Energy's headquarters in Maple Grove, Minnesota has a NEG Micon M700 wind turbine, visible from Interstate 94
 Laurel, New York has a Northern Power Systems 100 kW turbine at the Half Hollow Nursery and private tours of the operating turbine are provided by Eastern Energy Systems Inc. of Mattituck, New York.
 Lubbock, Texas has a Vestas V47 at the American Wind Power Center
 McKinney, Texas has a Wal-Mart store with several sustainability features, including two wind turbines manufactured by Bergey Windpower, of 1 kW and 50 kW nameplate capacity respectively
 Sweetwater, Texas has a 2 MW 60 Hz DeWind D8.2 prototype wind turbine for training students in the Texas State Technical College wind energy program

Observation deck
Some wind turbines on public display go one further, with observation decks beneath their nacelles. The observation decks are accessed with stairs inside the tower.
 Austria
 Wind turbine at Pesendorf, Lichtenegg, Lower Austria. Type Enercon E-66
 One turbine at the wind farm Energiepark near Bruck an der Leitha, Type Enercon E-66

 Canada
Grouse Mountain Resorts in North Vancouver, British Columbia installed a Leitwind 1.5MW wind turbine with an observation deck, atop a 65m tower, at an elevation of 1,300m, opening just before the 2010 Winter Olympics.

 Germany
 One wind turbine at Windpark Holtriem. Type Enercon E-66
 Visitor wind turbine "Windfang" (German for "Wind Catcher") nearby Aachen. Type Enercon E-66
 Wind turbine Südkronsberg on the Kronsberg hill near Hannover, Type Enercon E-66

 Netherlands
 The Siemens plant in Zoetermeer features a wind turbine with 40m blade length and an observation deck. Type Enron Wind (Tacke) 1.5s

 United Kingdom
 Another Enercon E-66 wind turbine with an observation deck belonging to Ecotricity is in the English town of Swaffham.

References

Wind turbines